Cantor is an English surname. One possible derivation is from the Middle English word gaunter, glover. Alternatively, it may derive from cantere meaning one who sings, possibly related to the Latin base of cant or both sharing a Proto-Indo-European root with *kan-, both meaning song or to sing. It may also refer to the Anglo-Norman chantour or the Old French chantroir meaning "enchanter or magician" or cantor meaning leader of a choir, possibly also from the Latin precentor.

Notable people with the surname include:

 Andrés Cantor (born 1962), Spanish-language soccer announcer
 Arthur Cantor (1920–2001), American theatrical producer
 Aviva Cantor (born 1940), American journalist, lecturer and author
 B. Gerald Cantor (1916–1996), American businessman
 Cantor Fitzgerald, financial services firm founded by him
 Brett Cantor (1967–1993), American record executive and nightclub owner
 Brian Cantor (born 1948), Vice-Chancellor of the University of York, UK
 Charles Cantor (born 1942), American molecular geneticist
 David Cantor (born 1954), American actor and singer
 Eddie Cantor (1892–1964), American comedian, singer, actor, songwriter
 Eric Cantor (born 1963), American politician
 Geoffrey Cantor (born 1943), professor of history and philosophy of science at the University of Leeds
 Georg Cantor (1845–1918), German mathematician, founder of set theory
 Jacob A. Cantor (1854–1921), New York politician
 James Cantor (born 1966), American-Canadian clinical psychologist specializing in sexology
 Jay Cantor (born 1948), American novelist and essayist
 Leo Cantor (1919–1995), American NFL football player 
 Liz Cantor (born 1982), Australian television presenter
 Max Cantor (1959–1991), American journalist and actor
 Mircea Cantor (born 1977), Romanian visual artist
 Moritz Cantor (1829–1920), German historian of mathematics
 Nancy Cantor (born 1952), Chancellor and President of Syracuse University
 Noah Cantor (born 1971), Canadian footballer
 Norman Cantor (1929–2004), Canadian medievalist
 Peter Cantor (died 1197), French Roman Catholic theologian
 Paul Cantor (1945–2022), American literary critic
 Paul Cantor (Canadian lawyer) (1942-2018), Canadian lawyer
 Rob Cantor (born 1983), American singer-songwriter
 Steven Cantor, American film/television director
 Theodore Edward Cantor (1809–1860), Danish biologist
 Tim Cantor (born 1969), American surrealism artist and writer
 Wulfstan the Cantor (c.960 – early 11th century), Anglo-Saxon monk

See also 
 Cant (surname)
 Canter (surname)
 Cantor
 Kantor (surname)

Jewish surnames